Rust Blaster (stylized as RustBlaster) is a Japanese manga series written and illustrated by Yana Toboso. It was serialized in Square Enix's Monthly GFantasy and published in a single volume in May 2006.

Publication
The series is written and illustrated by Yana Toboso. It was serialized in Monthly GFantasy, from the November 2005 issue to the April 2006 issue, and published in a single tankōbon volume, which was released on May 27, 2006.

In January 2015, Yen Press announced they licensed the series for English publication. They released the volume on August 18, 2015.

Reception
Jason Thompson from Otaku USA criticized the series, stating it "works best as a so-bad-it's-good comedy". Gregory Smith from The Fandom Post offered a different perspective, recommended the series to new shōnen manga fans. Christel Scheja from Splash Comics also praised the series, stating that while it wasn't as good as the author's next work, Black Butler, it was still "fun to read".

References

External links
 

Gangan Comics manga
Science fiction anime and manga
Shōnen manga
Slice of life anime and manga
Vampires in anime and manga
Yen Press titles